Camilla Rutherford (born 20 September 1976) is an English actress and fashion model.

Early life
Camilla Rutherford was born to (Gordon) Malcolm Rutherford (1939-1999), a financial journalist for the Financial Times and sometime advisor to Margaret Thatcher, and his second wife, Elizabeth, a magistrate, daughter of a French ambassador. One of three daughters, she wanted to attend St Paul's Girls' School as her more academic sisters did, but instead attended several schools, including St George's School, Ascot, and Woodbridge School before studying maths at Newcastle University, which she left to focus on modelling.

Career
Her first film roles were in the short films, Je t'aime John Wayne and in Stardom. In 2001, she played Isobel in Gosford Park. In March 2004, as she was opening in a new play called Three Women, she commented - "I don't want to leave modelling just yet. It's great fun. Theatre, on the other hand, is terrifying. I hope I can take this experience and put it back into film work". In July 2004, she was on the cover of the magazine launched by Annabel's nightclub, posing with Mark Birley's dogs. She was the face of Max Factor for Autumn 2004, and Links of London jewellers, and was also interviewed in The Observer. She is in the films Vanity Fair (2004) and The Freediver She was photographed by Bryan Adams for the sixth issue of Zoo Magazine. She portrayed Jocasta, the daughter of a wealthy merchant and friend to Octavia of the Julii in the series Rome and had a role in The Darjeeling Limited. Rutherford starred in the multi-award-winning 1920s/1930s sci-fi Dimensions. She starred in ‘'Breathe'’, which premiered at the London Film Festival. Rutherford starred in the period film Phantom Thread.

Personal life
Rutherford was married to PR & Marketing director Rufus Abbott from 2003 to 2007. They have two children, Hector and Maud. She subsequently had two more children, Nancy (born 2009) and Blaise (born 2015). Rutherford is represented by United Agents as an actress. As a model she is represented by Select Model Management in London, Marilyn Agency in Paris and Elite Model Management in New York. She has contributed to the new quarterly supplement to the Spectator- Spectator Life.

References

External links
Observer interview

Photographs of Camilla Rutherford on WireImage.com

1976 births
Alumni of Newcastle University
Living people
People educated at Woodbridge School
Select Model Management models